is a professional Japanese baseball player. He plays infielder for the Yokohama DeNA BayStars.

References 

2002 births
Living people
Baseball people from Shizuoka Prefecture
Japanese baseball players
Nippon Professional Baseball infielders
Yokohama DeNA BayStars players